The Living Sea is a Canadian nature television series which aired on CBC Television from 1957 to 1962.

Premise
University of British Columbia zoology professor Ian McTaggart-Cowan hosted this series on marine life, both plants and animals.

Scheduling
This half-hour series was initially broadcast for one season on Sunday afternoons from 7 July to 13 October 1957, then resumed 5 January to 30 March 1958. Episodes were rebroadcast on Wednesdays at 5:30 p.m. from 4 July to 19 September 1962 under the supervision of Tom Connachie.

References

External links
 

CBC Television original programming
1957 Canadian television series debuts
1958 Canadian television series endings
Black-and-white Canadian television shows
Nature educational television series
Television shows filmed in Vancouver